Ehrenberg is a German surname. Notable people with the surname include:

 Andrew S. C. Ehrenberg (1926–2010), an English statistician and marketing scientist
 Carl Ehrenberg (1878–1962), German composer
 Christian Gottfried Ehrenberg (1795–1876), German naturalist, zoologist, comparative anatomist, geologist, and microscopist
 Eleonora Ehrenbergů (sometimes spelled Ehrenbergová or Ehrenberg; 1832–1912), Czech operatic soprano
 Felipe Ehrenberg (1943–2017), Mexican artist
 Geoffrey Elton, born Gottfried Rudolf Otto Ehrenberg (1921–1994), German-born British political and constitutional historian
 Hans Ehrenberg (1883–1958), German Jewish Christian theologian, brother of historian Victor Ehrenberg
 Herman Ehrenberg (1816–1866), the namesake of Ehrenberg, Arizona, military volunteer fought against Mexico in the Texas Revolution, survivor of the Goliad massacre, who published his memoirs of the Revolution in Germany in the 1840s (translated into English in the 20th century)
 Ashley Montagu (born Israel Ehrenberg) (1905–1999), English anthropologist and humanist
 Lewis Elton (born 1923), born Ludwig Ehrenberg, German-born British physicist and specialist in higher education
 Paul Ehrenberg (1876–1949), German violinist and painter
 Richard Ehrenberg (1857–1921), German economist
 Ronald G. Ehrenberg (born 1946), American professor of labor economics, Cornell University
 Ralph Elliott (1921–2012), born Rudolf Ehrenberg, professor of English
 Victor Ehrenberg (historian) (1891, Altona–1976), German historian, the father of Geoffrey and Lewis Elton
 Victor Ehrenberg (jurist) (1851–1929), German jurist
 Wilhelm Schubert van Ehrenberg (1637–1676), artist

See also
 Ehrenburg (disambiguation)

German toponymic surnames
German-language surnames
Jewish surnames

References

German-language surnames